The Chicago Burlington and Quincy O-5 was a class of 36 4-8-4 "Northern" type steam locomotives built by the Baldwin Locomotive Works in 1930 and the Chicago, Burlington and Quincy (CB&Q) Railroad between 1936 and 1940 and operated by the CB&Q until the late 1950s.

The locomotives saw service pulling both freight and passenger trains and four have been preserved, all of which are on display.

History

With an increase of traffic on the CB&Q, they needed more powerful locomotives to pull the heavier loads and increased number of cars hauled. In 1930, the CB&Q ordered eight 4-8-4 locomotives (Nos. 5600-5607) from the Baldwin Locomotive Works and classified them as O-5. With the success of the O-5 locomotives, the CB&Q built 13 more 4-8-4 locomotives classified as O-5A at its own West Burlington, Iowa shops in 1937. Of the first six O-5s had fireboxes burning lignite coal while the last two took bituminous coal. No. 5607 had a booster that added 13,200 lbs (5,987 kg) tractive effort. One of the locomotives was reported pulling an 82 car mail train on October 17, 1944. Numbers 5600, 5602, 5604, 5605 and 5606 were fitted with Security circulators and reclassified O-5A. Between 1936 and 1940, the CB&Q built their own versions of the O-5 following the success of the class and were classified as O-5A. Numbers 5609, 5618, 5619, 5620 were fitted with Security circulators and 5610 received thermic syphons. The last 15 O-5s (numbers 5621-5635) were fitted with roller bearings on every axle, lightweight rods, all-weather vestibule cabs and a solid pilot. Although, the O-5A locomotives were also built with abnormal design features; the seatboxes inside the cabs were positioned too low, and the boilers were humpbacked beyond the sandboxes. Numbers 5614, 5620, 5626, 5627, 5629, and 5632 were converted to burn oil later in their service lives and were reclassified as O-5B. 

The O-5 class locomotives were capable at travelling at speeds as high as fourty-five miles per hour while hauling 125 loaded cars. By 1954, as the CB&Q invested in adding diesel locomotives to their roster, the O-5's were reassigned to pull freight trains in certain divisions; some O-5's were reassigned to run between Galesburg and Clyde, Illinois, North La Crosse, Wisconsin, and Pacific Junction, Iowa; other O-5's were reassigned to operate in the Lincoln-Omaha divisions in Nebraska and Iowa. As the railroad invested in adding EMD SD9 roadswitchers throughout the mid and late 1950s, the usefulness in the O-5's diminished, and most of them were put into storage, while those that remained in service were solely relagated to operate east of Lincoln, Nebraska. For two weeks in January 1957, eight O-5A locomotives were loaned to the Grand Trunk Western (GTW), in response to the GTW leasing some of its 4-8-4's to its parent company, the Canadian National, during a locomotive fireman strike on the Canadian Pacific. In July that same year, all six of the O-5B locomotives were removed from storage to operate in the Lincoln-Omaha divisions, in response to several diesel locomotives being transferred, in favor of that month's Nebraska wheat harvest. After the Lincoln-Omaha divisions were dieselized in November 1957, all of the remaining O-5 locomotives were removed from revenue service.

Between 1955 and 1959, five of the O-5 class locomotives (numbers 5600, 5618, 5626, 5631, and 5632) were used to pull occasional excursion trains for the CB&Q, prior to their retirement. Beginning in 1960, No. 5632 was being used to pull additional excursion trains for the CB&Q's steam program, and this lasted until November 1, 1964, when the locomotive hauled its last train before its flue time expired. No. 5632 was subsequently disassembled for repairs, but by 1966, the railroad got a new president, Louis W. Menk, who ended the program, and the repairs on 5632 were halted. The locomotive was sold to steam engine caretaker Richard Jensen, who moved it to the Chicago and Western Indiana Roundhouse for storage. In 1969, No. 5632 was moved to a scrapyard, but was derailed on a switch and was subsequently scrapped in November 1972.

Preservation
Four of the Burlington Route's "Northerns" have been preserved, all of which are of the O-5A/B batch.
 #5614 is on display at Patee Park in St. Joseph, Missouri.
 #5629 is on display at the Colorado Railroad Museum in Golden, Colorado.
 #5631 is on display at a depot in Sheridan, Wyoming.
 #5633 is on display at the Douglas Railroad Interpretive Center in Douglas, Wyoming.

Roster

References

Bibliography
 
 
 

Chicago, Burlington and Quincy Railroad
4-8-4 locomotives
Baldwin locomotives
Preserved steam locomotives of the United States
Railway locomotives introduced in 1930
Standard gauge locomotives of the United States
Steam locomotives of the United States
Chicago, Burlington and Quincy locomotives